Cyrtodactylus huongsonensis  is a species of gecko that is endemic to Vietnam.

References 

Cyrtodactylus
Reptiles described in 2011